The Dhirari (or Dirari or Tirari) were an indigenous Australian people of the state of South Australia. They are not to be confused with the Diyari people, though the Dirari/Dhirari language (now extinct) was a dialect of the Diyari language.

Name
Some confusion arose when, in 1904, the ethnographer A. W. Howitt confused this distinct, if small, tribe with their neighbours, the Diyari, suggesting it was a name for a horde of the latter. The German missionary Otto Siebert testified in 1936 that the Tirari's speech differed from Diyari language.

Country
They dwelt around the eastern shore of Lake Eyre, running northwards from Muloorina to the Warburton River. Their eastern frontiers were at Killalapaninna.

History of contact
The Tirari were extinct by the time of Tindale's writing (1974). Their name is memorialized in the toponym denoting part of the land they occupied, Tirari Desert.

Notes

Citations

Sources

Aboriginal peoples of South Australia